Aylin Pereyra (born ) is an Argentine female volleyball player. She was part of the Argentina women's national volleyball team.

She participated in the 2011 FIVB Volleyball World Grand Prix.
At club level she played for Boca Juniors in 2011.

References

External links
 Profile at FIVB.org

1988 births
Living people
Argentine women's volleyball players
Place of birth missing (living people)